The Recourse to the Method is a Mexican-Cuban drama film directed by Chilean filmmaker Miguel Littín. It is based on the 1974 novel of the same name written by Alejo Carpentier. It was entered into the 1978 Cannes Film Festival. The film was also selected as the Cuban entry for the Best Foreign Language Film at the 51st Academy Awards, but was not accepted as a nominee.

Cast
 Nelson Villagra - El Primer Magistrado
 Ernesto Gómez Cruz - Cholo
 Salvador Sánchez - Peralta
 Reynaldo Miravalles - Oberst Hoffmann
 Raúl Pomares - General Galván
 Katy Jurado - La Mayorala
 Alain Cuny - El Académico
 Gabriel Retes - El Estudiante
 María Adelina Vera - La Hija del Presidente
 Roger Cudney - Army captain
 Didier Flamand
 Denis Perrot
 Monique Perrot
 Jacques Rispal

See also
 List of submissions to the 51st Academy Awards for Best Foreign Language Film
 List of Cuban submissions for the Academy Award for Best Foreign Language Film

References

External links

1978 films
1978 drama films
1970s Spanish-language films
Films based on Cuban novels
Films directed by Miguel Littín
Cuban drama films
Mexican drama films
1970s Mexican films